Trstenik is a village in the municipality of Rosoman, North Macedonia.

Demographics
According to the statistics of the Bulgarian ethnographer Vasil Kanchov from 1900, 140 inhabitants lived in Trstenik, all Christian Bulgarians. On the 1927 ethnic map of Leonhard Schulze-Jena, the village is written as "Trstani" and shown as a Christian Bulgarian village. According to the 2002 census, the village had a total of 246 inhabitants. Ethnic groups in the village include:

Macedonians 239
Serbs 7

References

Villages in Rosoman Municipality